Kartir (also spelled Karder, Karter and Kerdir; Middle Persian: 𐭪𐭫𐭲𐭩𐭫 Kardīr) was a powerful and influential Zoroastrian priest during the reigns of four Sasanian kings in the 3rd-century. His name is cited in the inscriptions of Shapur I (as well as in the Res Gestae Divi Saporis) and the Paikuli inscription of Narseh. Kartir also had inscriptions of his own made in the present-day Fars Province (then known as Pars). His inscriptions narrates his rise to power throughout the reigns of Shapur I, Hormizd I, Bahram I, and Bahram II. During the brief reign of Bahram II's son and successor Bahram III, Kartir was amongst the nobles who supported the rebellion of Narseh, who overthrew Bahram III and ascended the throne. During Narseh's reign, Kartir faded into obscurity.

Name 
Kartir's name is spelled in several ways in the engravings; Middle Persian <kltyl, kltyly, krtyr, kltyr>, Parthian <krtyr>, Greek Karteir, and Coptic Kardel. The name was also used in the northeastern Iranian world, being spelt <krt'yr> in Sogdian and as Kirdira in Bactrian.

Biography

Under Shapur I and Hormizd I

Kartir may have been a eunuch, due to being depicted without a beard in the Sasanian reliefs. He first appears in historical records in Shapur I's inscription at the Ka'ba-ye Zartosht, which was most likely created between 260 and 262. Kartir is the only religious bureaucrat mentioned in the inscription. Shapur I, a "lukewarm Zoroastrian", was known for his tolerance towards other religions. Although admiring the teachings of his own religion and encouraging the Zoroastrian clergy, Shapur I let the Jews, Christians, Buddhists, and Hindus to freely practice their religion. He was also friendly towards the founder of Manichaeism, Mani, whom he allowed to preach freely and even to be an escort in his military expeditions. 

Shapur I religious practices seems to have been somewhat unusual, with animal sacrifice being made for the soul of the kings and queens of the Sasanian family. This presumably seemed "pagan" to Zoroastrian priests.  Kartir, who "abhorred animal sacrifice" was unable to stop Shapur I from doing them. Shapur I died in 270, and was succeeded by Hormizd I, who gave Kartir clothes that were worn by the upper class, the cap and belt (kulāf ud kamarband) and appointed him as the chief priest (mowbed).

Hormizd I died the following year; Bahram I, who was never considered a candidate for succession of the throne by his father, ascended the throne with the aid of Kartir, whose authority and influence had greatly increased. Bahram I then made a settlement with his brother Narseh to give up his entitlement to the throne in return for the governorship of the important frontier province of Armenia, which was constantly the subject of war between the Roman and Sasanian Empires. Narseh held the title of Vazurg Šāh Arminān ("Great King of Armenia"), which was used by the heir to the throne. Nevertheless, Narseh still most likely viewed Bahram I as a usurper.

Under Bahram I

The previous Sasanian shahs had pursued a policy of religious tolerance towards the non-Zoroastrian minorities in the empire. However, with Bahram I's accession to the throne, and the rise of the authority of the Zoroastrian priesthood and the increasing influence of Kartir, this changed; when Mani reached the city of Gundishapur, much uproar occurred, in the same fashion as Jesus' entry into Jerusalem. Kartir, along with other Zoroastrian priests protested and made Bahram I have Mani imprisoned and sentenced to death in 274.

Mani's death was followed by the persecution of his followers by Kartir and the Zoroastrian clergy, who used the persecution of religious minorities as a method to increase and spread their vast influence. Mani was seen by the Zoroastrian clergy as heterogeneous philosopher and a threatening pagan who was presenting an obscure perception of Zoroastrianism, which had been tainted by non-Zoroastrian (i.e., Jewish, Buddhist, and Christian) ideas. With the backing of Bahram I, Kartir laid foundations to a Zoroastrian state church. As a result, Bahram I became applauded in Sasanian-based sources as a "benevolent and worthy king." His son Bahram II succeeded him as shah; he may have been aided by Kartir to ascend the throne instead of Narseh. This most likely frustrated Narseh, who had now been neglected from succession several times.

Under Bahram II, Bahram III and Narseh 

Bahram II, like his father, received Kartir well. He saw him as his mentor, and handed out several honors to Kartir, giving him the rank of grandee (wuzurgan), and appointing him as the supreme judge (dadwar) of the whole empire, which indicates that thenceforth priests were given the office of judge. Kartir was also appointed the steward of the Anahid fire-temple at Istakhr, which had originally been under the care of the Sasanian family. The Sasanian kings thus lost much of their religious authority in the empire. The clergy from now on served as judges all over the country, with court cases most likely being based on Zoroastrian jurisprudence, with the exception of when representatives of other religions had conflicts with each other.

It is thus under Bahram II that Kartir unquestionably becomes a powerful figure in the empire; the latter claimed on his inscription at the Ka'ba-ye Zartosht that he "struck down" the non-Zoroastrian minorities, such as the Christians, Jews, Mandaeans, Manichaeans, and Buddhists. According to the modern historian Parvaneh Pourshariati: "it is not clear, however, to what extent Kartir's declarations reflect the actual implementation, or for that matter, success, of the measures he is supposed to have promoted." Indeed, Jewish and Christian sources, for example, makes no mention of persecutions during this period. Before Bahram II, all the previous Sasanian shahs had been "lukewarm Zoroastrians." He died in 293 and was succeeded by his son Bahram III.

Four months into Bahram III's reign, Narseh was summoned to Mesopotamia at the request of many members of the Iranian nobility. He met them in the passage of Paikuli in the province of Garmekan, where he was firmly approved and likely also declared shah for the first time. The reasons behind the nobles favour of Narseh might have been due to his jurisdiction as governor, his image as an advocate of the Zoroastrian religion and as an insurer for harmony and prosperity of the empire. His ancestry from the early Sasanian family probably also played a role. Kartir was one of those nobles who supported Narseh, which is attested in the Paikuli inscription. Narseh's reign marked the return to the policy of religious tolerance which had been practiced by his father. Kartir fades into obscurity in historical records under Narseh, due to not doing anything noteworthy as high priest.

Legacy and assessment 
According to the modern historian Prods Oktor Skjærvø, "In both Iranist and non-Iranist literature, there has been a tendency to elaboration and hyperbole. Several scholars have taken a strict and critical view of Kartir from their modern, and so irrelevant, vantage point." Zaehner called Kartir a "religious zealot of quite uncommon ardour" and to "the process of intolerance initiated and zestfully developed by Kartir". Russell called him a "a ruthless fanatic, Kartir, [who] promoted the xenophobic state cult", while Folz refers to him as "fanatical". More positive views of Kartir are also found in modern sources, such as Hinz, who called him a "spiritual man yearning for a religious truth that ought to be revealed to all", while Neusner described "the [Sasanian] government’s enthusiasm for Kartir’s program".

See also 
 Kartir's inscription at Naqsh-e Rajab

References

Sources

 
 
 .

Further reading

 Kartir's inscription on the Ka'ba-i Zartosht and the inscription at Naqsh-e Rajab from

3rd-century births
3rd-century deaths
Zoroastrian priests
3rd-century clergy
3rd-century Iranian people
People from the Sasanian Empire